Keegan Reginald Pereira (born 8 September 1991) is an Indian-born Canadian field hockey player, who plays as a midfielder or forward for the Canadian national team.

Club career
Pereira played for the Victoria Vikes and UBC Thunderbirds before he moved to Europe to play for Royal Wellington in Belgium. In 2016, he moved to Germany to play for Uhlenhorst Mülheim, with whom he won two Bundesliga titles.

International career
He competed at the 2014 Commonwealth Games. In 2016, he was named to Canada's Olympic team. Pereira has played in two World Cups, in 2010 and 2018.  In June 2019, he was selected in the Canada squad for the 2019 Pan American Games. They won the silver medal as they lost 5–2 to Argentina in the final.

In June 2021, Pereira was named to Canada's 2020 Summer Olympics team.

References

External links
 
 Keegan Pereira at Field Hockey Canada
 
 
 
 

1991 births
Living people
Canadian male field hockey players
Field hockey players from Mumbai
Male field hockey midfielders
Male field hockey forwards
2010 Men's Hockey World Cup players
Field hockey players at the 2011 Pan American Games
Field hockey players at the 2014 Commonwealth Games
Field hockey players at the 2016 Summer Olympics
Field hockey players at the 2020 Summer Olympics
Field hockey players at the 2018 Commonwealth Games
2018 Men's Hockey World Cup players
Field hockey players at the 2019 Pan American Games
Commonwealth Games competitors for Canada
Olympic field hockey players of Canada
Pan American Games medalists in field hockey
Pan American Games silver medalists for Canada
Indian emigrants to Canada
Naturalized citizens of Canada
Canadian sportspeople of Indian descent
Canadian people of Goan descent
HTC Uhlenhorst Mülheim players
UBC Thunderbirds players
Medalists at the 2011 Pan American Games
Medalists at the 2019 Pan American Games
Men's Feldhockey Bundesliga players
20th-century Canadian people
21st-century Canadian people
Canadian expatriate sportspeople in Germany